The Squires were Neil Young's first band, The Squires may also refer to:

 The Squires (Pebbles band), a garage rock band from Bristol, Connecticut
 The Squires, an Ohio garage rock band that featured Phil Keaggy
 the band that backed Tom Jones until 1969
 the band which later became the Count Five
 Curtis Knight and the Squires led by Curtis Knight and featuring Jimi Hendrix
 the band called Canadian Squires, which was an early incarnation of The Band
"The Squires" rock band from Jamaica High School in the 1960s. Played gigs and clubs around New York & performed at The World's Fair in 1964.
 vicious killing robots created by the Forever Knights on Cartoon Network's Ben 10 episode The Unnaturals.